Francis Kallarackal was the Metropolitan Archbishop of  the Roman Catholic (Latin Rite) Archdiocese of Verapoly in India.  He was appointed by Pope Benedict XVI on 20 February 2010.

Born to Kallarackal Ouso and Brigitte of Kottapuram on 10 October 1941. He had his high school education from St. Albert's High School, Ernakulam and he joined the St. Joseph's Minor Seminary in 1956. After completing pre-degree course from St. Albert's College, Ernakulam, he joined St. Joseph's Pontifical Seminary, Carmelgiri, Alwaye, for pursuing studies in Philosophy. He completed his Masters in Theology from Propaganda College, Rome and was ordained as priest on 29 June 1968. He holds a Licentiate in Sacred Theology from Pontifical Urbaniana University, Rome and Post Graduation from Fairfiled University, USA. When he returned from abroad in 1970, he was appointed secretary to the then Archbishop Joseph Kelanthara.

From 1978 to 1986 he served as the social action director of the Archdiocese. He was then appointed the administrator of St. John's Medical College, Bangalore, which is established and managed by the Catholic Bishops' Conference of India.

In 1987, as the Diocese of Kottapuram was created through the bifurcation of the Archdiocese of Verapoly, he became the first bishop of Kottapuram by the Apostolic Letter "Romani et Pontificis" dated 3 July 1987. With his episcopal consecration on the feast day of St. Francis Assisi, the Diocese of Kottapuram was inaugurated on 4 October 1987. As the Bishop of Kottapuram, he called for a Diocesan Synod, conducted in  2007-2008.

Archbishop Francis Kallarakkal is the Vice President of the Kerala Catholic Bishops Council and Kerala Regional Latin Catholic Council and Archbishop of Verapoly. He serves as vice-chairman of the Media Commission of the Kerala Catholic Bishops' Council, Chairman of the Carmelgiri Pontifical Seminary Episcopal Commission and KRLCC publication "Jeevanadam".

As the Metropolitan Archbishop of Verapoly the Kallarakal called a Diocesan Synod in Verpaoly, and a diocesan synod at Kottapuram while he was serving as the Bishop of Kottapuram. The Diocesan Synod in Verapoly proposed major reformas in the Archdiocese of Verapoly, giving the laity more participation in the Church.

See also
Catholic Church hierarchy
Catholic Bishops' Conference of India
Christianity in India
Roman Catholicism in India
List of Roman Catholic dioceses in India
List of Roman Catholic dioceses (structured_view)-Episcopal Conference of India

References

External links

www.kcbcsite.com – Bishop Francis Kallarakal Appointed as Metrapolitan Archbishop of Verapoly 
CBCI official website
CBCI picture gallery
News Site of the Catholic Bishop's Conference
Official website of Archdiocese of Verapoly |  Most. Rev. Dr. Francis Kallarackal
Diocesan directory | www.ucanews.com

1941 births
Living people
21st-century Roman Catholic archbishops in India
People from Thrissur district